This is a list of Mayors of the municipality of Clarington, Ontario, from its inception in 1974 until the present day. Mayors of townships prior to merger are also listed.

Townships

Town of Bowmanville (1858–1974)

Darlington Township

Clarke Township

Municipality (1974–present)

Town of Newcastle (1974⁠–1993)

Clarington (1993–present)

References

Clarington